Joshua Owusu (born October 2, 1948) is a retired Olympic track and field athlete from Ghana. He specialised in the triple jump and the long jump events during his career.

Owusu represented Ghana at the 1972 Olympic Games where he finished in fourth place, 2 cm out of a medal. He claimed the gold medal in the men's triple jump event at the 1974 British Commonwealth Games for his native West African country.

References
 

1948 births
Living people
Ghanaian male triple jumpers
Ghanaian male long jumpers
Olympic athletes of Ghana
Athletes (track and field) at the 1972 Summer Olympics
Athletes (track and field) at the 1974 British Commonwealth Games
Commonwealth Games gold medallists for Ghana
Commonwealth Games medallists in athletics
African Games gold medalists for Ghana
African Games medalists in athletics (track and field)
Athletes (track and field) at the 1973 All-Africa Games
T.I. Ahmadiyya Senior High School (Kumasi) alumni
Medallists at the 1974 British Commonwealth Games